The Talum Glaciers are located on the southeast slopes of Mount Baker in the North Cascades of the U.S. state of Washington. The glaciers are connected to Squak Glacier to the west. Between 1850 and 1950, the Talum Glaciers retreated . During a cooler and wetter period from 1950 to 1979, the glaciers advanced  but between 1980 and 2006 retreated back .

See also 
List of glaciers in the United States

References 

Glaciers of Mount Baker
Glaciers of Washington (state)